The habenular trigone is a small depressed triangular area above the superior colliculus and on the lateral aspect of the posterior part of the taenia thalami.

Underlying this area is the habenula.

Fibers enter it from the stalk of the pineal gland, and others, forming what is termed the habenular commissure, pass across the middle line to the corresponding ganglion of the opposite side.

Most of its fibers are, however, directed downward and form a bundle, the fasciculus retroflexus of Meynert (or habenulointerpeduncular tract), which passes medial to the red nucleus, and, after decussating with the corresponding fasciculus of the opposite side, ends in the interpeduncular nucleus.

References

Habenula